Soledad Barrett Viedma was a Paraguayan militant activist involved in the resistance to the Brazilian military government. A granddaughter of the Spanish writer and activist Rafael Barrett, she spent her childhood in Uruguay where she was kidnapped by a group of Neo-Nazis. Having undergone guerilla training in Cuba, she joined the militant anti-fascist group Vanguarda Popular Revolucionária (VPR) in Brazil. In 1973, she was killed in the Massacre da Chácara São Bento, a massacre committed by Brazilian military police forces.

Early life
Soledad Barrett Viedma was born in January 1945 in Paraguay. Her father was Alejandro Barrett, the only son of the Spanish writer Rafael Barrett who had settled in Paraguay in the early 1910s. She spent most of her childhood in Montevideo where her family lived in exile due to their left-wing activism. At the age of 17, she was kidnapped by a Uruguayan group of Neo-Nazis. The incident resulted in two swastikas being incised on her thighs because she had refused to repeat slogans praising the German dictator Adolf Hitler.

Activism and death
In 1967, having been introduced to the milieu of militant activism, Barrett Viedma travelled to Cuba in order to undergo a guerilla training. It was there that she met her future husband, José Maria Ferreira de Araújo, a member of Vanguardia Popular Revolucionaria (VPR), a militant anti-fascist group from Brazil. The couple had one daughter. 

After her husband had disappeared, she relocated to his native Brazil and joined the resistance against the Brazilian military government. She was stationed at Recife and began a relationship with José Anselmo dos Santos, also known as Cabo Anselmo, a militant who had been a leader of the 1964 Brazilian coup d'état. On 8 January 1973, Barrett Viedma and five other members of the resistance movement were found dead in a barn in the town of São Bento, Abreu e Lima. According to the official version of events, they died during an armed confrontation with the police from which only Cabo Anselmo had managed to escape. It was later found, through the work of journalist Elio Gaspari, that the militants had been kidnapped in different locations, tortured and killed. The incident is known as the Massacre da Chácara São Bento and has been described by Gaspari as "one of the dictatorship's most savage massacres".

References

1945 births
1973 deaths
Paraguayan activists
Dead and missing in the fight against the military dictatorship in Brazil (1964–1985)